Suchá nad Parnou is a village and municipality in the Trnava District in the Trnava region of Slovakia. The municipality is located in the Trnava Upland, partially in the valley of the rivers Podháj and Parná. Suchá nad Parnou has an area of 1468 ha and is situated at an altitude of 161–231 m above sea level, with the center of the village at 174 m above sea level. The village Šelpice lays to the East, to the Southeast and South lay Zvončín and Ružindol, in the east Suchá nad Parnou is bordered by Dlhá. To the North Košolná, Boleráz and on Northwest Klčovany are located. Suchá nad Parnou is situated about 7 km to the west of Trnava.

Famous people 
 Ján Ježovít (*1909 –  † 1994), SDB,  Roman Catholic priest end Missionary (China, Thailand).

References

External links

http://en.e-obce.sk/obec/suchanadparnou/sucha-nad-parnou.html
http://www.suchanadparnou.sk/ 

Villages and municipalities in Trnava District